The Iowa State University campus contains over 160 buildings, several of which are listed on the National Register of Historic Places. Iowa State University's campus, specifically its Central Campus, has been recognized as one of the nation's most beautiful and was listed as a "medallion site" by the American Society of Landscape Architects in 1999.

Campus

Iowa State's main campus features 490 acres of trees, plants and classically designed buildings. The concept of an open central campus encircled by buildings, was the vision of Iowa State's first president, Adonijah Welch. The campus is dominated by a large 20 acre central lawn known as Central Campus. Along with the University of Virginia and Yale University, ISU's central campus was listed as a "medallion site" by the American Society of Landscape Architects in 1999. It was listed as one of 25 most beautiful sites in the United States in the book The Campus as a Work of Art.

Fountain of Four Seasons

The fountain was sculpted by Christian Petersen in 1941 after a request from Iowa State President Charles Friley. The previous fountain was a vertical water tower on which students would place toilet seats. President Friley hoped that with a new, beautiful fountain, students would no longer make jokes of it.

Lake LaVerne

Named for Dr. LaVerne W. Noyes, who also donated the funds to see that Alumni Hall could be completed after sitting unfinished and unused from 1905 to 1907. Dr. Noyes is an 1872 alumnus. Lake LaVerne is located west of the Memorial Union and south of Alumni Hall, Carver Hall, and Music Hall. The lake was a gift from Dr. Noyes in 1916.

Lake LaVerne is the home of two mute swans named Sir Lancelot and Elaine, donated to Iowa State by VEISHEA 1935.  In 1944, 1970, and 1971 cygnets  (baby swans) made their home on Lake LaVerne. Previously Sir Lancelot and Elaine were trumpeter swans but were too aggressive and in 1999 were replaced with two mute swans. In early 2002 Sir Lancelot suffered a broken foot from chasing a campus lawnmower. Sir Lancelot underwent surgery at Iowa State's College of Veterinary Medicine, but after months of physical therapy efforts in returning him to Lake LaVerne were unsuccessful.  Early spring 2003 Lake LaVerne welcomed is new and current mute swan duo. However, in support of DNR efforts to re-establish the trumpeter swans in Iowa, university officials avoided bringing breeding pairs of male and female mute swans to Iowa State which means the current Sir Lancelot and Elaine are both female.

Marston Water Tower

Iowa State is the home of the first elevated steel water tank west of the Mississippi River. Named the Marston Water Tower, it was erected in 1897 under the supervision and design of Anson Marston and his assistant Elmina Wilson.  The water tower was constructed due to a severe water shortage in 1895 that forced cancellation of classes. In 1978, the water tower was disconnected when the university switched to municipal water. It was listed in the National Register of Historic Places on May 27, 1982, and restored in 1987.

Reiman Gardens

Roy Reiman is a 1957 graduate of Iowa State in agriculture journalism and he is the founder of Reiman Publications. The Reiman Gardens are named for Roy and his wife Bobbi who donated $1.3 million to begin their development. Located south of Jack Trice Stadium. Opened in 1995, the gardens have grown to become the largest public garden in the state. The popular Christina Reiman Butterfly Wing was opened in November 2002.

Veenker Memorial Golf Course

Named for George F. Veenker, head football coach at Iowa State from 1931 to 1936. He was also athletic director from 1933 until 1945. The golf course was completed in 1938 and given its current name in 1959.

Research farm
The Western Iowa Experimental Farm is to be found in Castana.

Current buildings

This is an incomplete listing of buildings at Iowa State University. Click on the building title for additional building information.

Past buildings

Timeline

Facilities
The Iowa State University/Ames YWCA is on the campus grounds, at the Knapp-Storms Commons.

The Ames-ISU Student YMCA used to be in the Lab of Mechanics, Room 109. The chapter was established in 1887. It became affiliated with the national YMCA in 1900. Originally in Alumni Hall, it moved to Room 109 in 1993.

References

Iowa State University buildings and structures
Iowa State University